Dalit Ezhilmalai  (24 June 1945 – 6 May 2020) was an Indian union minister. He was a leader of the Pattali Makkal Katchi (PMK), and was Union Minister of State, Health and Family Welfare (Independent Charge) during the Atal Bihari Vajpayee government in 1998–99.

Early life 
He was born on 24 June 1945 in Irumbedu village in Madurantakam taluk of  Chengalpattu district in Tamil Nadu. He served the erstwhile Post & Telegraph Department between 1963 and 1987. During this period, he was sent on deputation to the Army for five years up to 1974. As an army officer he took part in the Indo-Pakistani War of 1971. He was a recipient of the K Sainik Seva Medal from the president of India for meritorious service in the Indian Army. Even while in the government service, he held key positions in the National Federation of Postal Union and Scheduled Castes and Scheduled Tribes Employees Association Co-ordination Committee, Tamil Nadu and Puducherry, besides launching the Dalit People's Front in 1980.

Career 
After the formation of the Pattali Makkal Katchi in 1989, he joined the party and became its general secretary. In the 1998 Lok Sabha election, he was elected from the Chidambaram (reserved) constituency when the PMK contested the poll as part of the AIADMK-led coalition. In March 1998, he was made Union Minister of State for Health and Family Welfare with independent charge in the Vajpayee Cabinet. However, in August 1999, he quit the PMK as he was denied the party nomination to contest again from the constituency. Later, he joined the AIADMK and was elected as an AIADMK MP from Tiruchirappalli (Lok Sabha constituency) in the 2001 by-election.

Death 
He died on 6 May 2020, aged 74, in Chennai.

References

External links 
 Parliament of India
 BJP - Short Bio (Archive)

Lok Sabha members from Tamil Nadu
People from Tamil Nadu
1945 births
2020 deaths
Pattali Makkal Katchi politicians
All India Anna Dravida Munnetra Kazhagam politicians
India MPs 1998–1999
India MPs 1999–2004
People from Kanchipuram district